At the beginning of the 1970s, video games existed almost entirely as novelties passed around by programmers and technicians with access to computers, primarily at research institutions and large companies. The history of video games transitioned into a new era early in the decade, however, with the rise of the commercial video game industry.

November
Computer Space is released in North America.
Galaxy Game is released.

December
December 3 – The Oregon Trail is first demonstrated to students at Carleton College in Northfield, Minnesota.

See also
Early history of video games
1971 in games

References

Video games by year
Video games